Mammoth Mountain Ski Area is a large ski resort in the western United States, located in eastern California along the east side of the Sierra Nevada mountain range in the Inyo National Forest.

The resort was founded in 1953 by Dave McCoy and, from 2005 to 2017, was owned by the Starwood Capital Group.

In 2017, Mammoth Resorts announced its sale by Starwood to a partnership of Aspen Skiing Company and KSL Capital Partners, later named Alterra Mountain Company.

Description
The ski area is located on the north side of Mammoth Mountain in the volcanic Long Valley Caldera. Overnight guests stay in the town of Mammoth Lakes, California and occasionally in neighboring towns such as Bishop and June Lake. June Lake's ski area is also owned by Mammoth Mountain Ski Area. The top of the mountain has challenging chutes and groomed as well as mogul runs. There are eight Unbound terrain parks. Unbound Main, adjacent to Main Lodge, is highly praised by extreme snowboarding and skiing enthusiasts, and is one of the major attractions of the ski resort.

Mammoth Mountain also has one of the longest ski seasons in North America, which averages from the start of November to Memorial Day. The resort occasionally enjoys a longer season, as in 2016/2017, when it opened on November the 8th and did not close until the August the 6th. The 1994–95 season was Mammoth Mountain's longest, over ten months, with the resort operating from October 8 until August 13.  The 2016–2017 season was the second snowiest on record, with 618 inches (2010-2011 with 668.5 inches is the resort record), and it stayed open until August 6, 2017.  January 2017 was the snowiest month in Mammoth history, with 246 inches.

As recently as the 1980s, senior citizens could ski on Mammoth for free. , those aged at least 80 years may ski for free.

Terrain aspects
 North: 65%
 West: 10%
 East: 22%
 South: 3%

Logistics

While the ski area is located in central California, it is mainly frequented by skiers and snowboarders from southern California. Although it is a five-hour drive from Los Angeles via U.S. 395, it is much closer for southern California winter sports enthusiasts than the Lake Tahoe area resorts, which are more accessible to the San Francisco Bay Area. Mammoth Mountain is a more popular destination than southern California ski resorts in the San Bernardino and San Gabriel Mountains, because of these areas' heavy reliance on snowmaking, coupled with significantly lighter winter precipitation and their notably shorter seasons. Although Mammoth is physically closer to San Francisco and central valley cities than Los Angeles, most mountain passes along the Sierra crest are closed after the first major snowfall, and this lack of a trans-Sierra travel route creates an unusually long drive to Mammoth (6–8 hours) from the Bay Area and most of central California.

Airline service

In recent years, Mammoth has hosted more visitors from outside of California and Nevada.  Scheduled passenger service, as of November 2020, is available to Mammoth Yosemite Airport (MMH) near Mammoth Lakes from Los Angeles (LAX) on a year-round basis via United Airlines CRJ700 flights operated by SkyWest.  United Airlines also offers seasonal nonstop service from San Francisco (SFO) and Denver International Airport (DEN) to Mammoth Lakes.

History
Mammoth was founded by Dave McCoy, a hydrographer for the Los Angeles Department of Water and Power. As a member of the Eastern Sierra Ski Club in the 1930s, McCoy noticed that Mammoth Mountain consistently held more snow than other mountains. The Ski Club had a portable rope tow. McCoy bought the rope tow from the club in 1941 and usually kept it at Mammoth. In 1953, the United States Forest Service awarded a permit to McCoy to operate the ski area, and the first ski lift was built in 1955.

Incidents
As the ski area grew, McCoy faced adverse circumstances: the 1973 oil crisis, an avalanche in 1979 that destroyed a ski lift, and a prolonged drought that led to layoffs in 1991.

Mammoth had a number of associated fatalities in its history:
In 1973, the resort bought Sierra Pacific Airlines from 3-D film cinematographer Chris Condon.  On March 13, 1974, a film crew for Wolper Productions filming a National Geographic history of Australopithecus at the resort was killed when their Convair 440 aircraft (N4819C) flew into a  ridge shortly after an evening take-off from Eastern Sierra Regional Airport in Bishop, killing all 35 on board including 31 Wolper crew members—although not Wolper himself. The filmed segment was recovered in the wreckage and was broadcast in the television show Primal Man.  The National Transportation Safety Board was unable to determine the cause of the accident, and the resort sold the airline.  Sierra Pacific previously operated scheduled passenger flights with turboprop aircraft between Mammoth Lakes and Burbank, Fresno, Los Angeles and Las Vegas.
On April 6, 2006, three ski patrollers at the ski area perished due to a combination of CO2 and hydrogen sulfide (H2S) poisoning. Both gases are present on a known dangerous fumarole on the mountain and were more concentrated on that day because the fumarole had been covered by snow for days. Four patrollers, including John "Scott" McAndrews and James Juarez, were raising the fence around the fumarole, which had become buried due to heavy snowfall. The fumarole had melted a cavern below the snowbridge which collapsed under James and Scott. The pair of men fell  and perished within a matter of minutes. Another ski patroller, Walt Rosenthal, perished and seven others were injured trying to rescue James and Scott. The oxygen masks used by the Mammoth Mountain ski patrol did not completely seal outer gases from coming in.

Sale to Intrawest

In January 1996, Intrawest Corporation and Mammoth Mountain Ski area announced that Intrawest Corporation had purchased 33% of Mammoth and June Mountain ski operations, as well as all of the developable real estate owned by Mammoth Mountain Ski Area. In 1998, Intrawest increased their partnership interest to 58%. The development of three new village areas: The Village at Mammoth, Sierra Star, and Juniper Springs, has brought new developments to the resort.

The Village at Mammoth, a European-style and pedestrian-only complex, was built in a style similar to other Intrawest properties, such as Whistler in British Columbia or Keystone in Colorado. The Village opened in 2003 with various stores, restaurants, galleries and 166 luxury condominiums. The 15-passenger Village Gondola, which departs from the Village, transports skiers and snowboarders directly to the Canyon Lodge base.

Sale to Starwood Capital
On February 23, 2005, Dave McCoy announced the pending sale of his stake in Mammoth Mountain, after 68 years of running the ski area. On October 5, 2005, Mammoth announced that a majority stake will be sold to Starwood Capital Group, a private equity fund specializing in real estate, run by Barry Sternlicht. The sale price was $365 million.

Because of a poor economy in California, beginning in 2007, many of the stores and restaurants in The Village closed.  However, in the fall of 2010, with the help of local business owners, the Village has seen a resurgence of new restaurants and stores.

Changes and re-development

Before and during the changes of ownership, the ski area underwent major changes. The resort went from 16 chairs in the 1980s to 23 today. The visitor center has telescopes and historical displays.

Almost all the old, slow, double chair lifts were replaced with high-speed quad, and six-seater lifts, traveling at around 1000 feet per minute. For these modernizations, the resort is a longtime customer to the Doppelmayr group.  Several old lifts were also removed. The Mid-Chalet, which once had picnic tables on its roof, was completely remodeled in the early 2000s, renamed McCoy Station, and now features gourmet foods and a cafeteria. Large vintage photos of McCoy and his family can be found hanging from the ceiling there. The Mill Cafe, a small rustic bar and snack area was added in the early 2000s.

In 2011, Chair 5 was chosen to be upgraded for the 2011–2012 season.  Chair 5 was upgraded from a Yan-fixed three person chair to a Doppelmayr high speed quad.  The ride time is reported to be half as long, and the capacity was increased from 1800 an hour to an estimated 2400 people an hour.  In line with tradition, the chair was also given a new name: High Five Express.

Mammoth Mountain is also the owner of the June Mountain ski area in the small Mono County town of June Lake, California.  On June 21, 2012, the CEO of Mammoth Mountain announced that they are closing June Mountain for the 2012–2013 season, after more than 50 years of operations. June Mountain reopened for the 2013-2014 ski season.

As of 2018, a zip-line is under construction. Once complete, it will be the steepest in North America. It goes from the top of the mountain near the upper gondola to the bottom near Main Lodge, with a stop near the top of Chair 1.

RFID Lift Pass
The RFID lift pass was implemented for the 2011–2012 season.  It was designed to combat two issues: long lines at the lifts and long lines at the ticket window.  A total of 72 RFID gates were installed over 18 different lifts. The RFID lift pass has a circuit in the ticket that sensors to the gates to open when approached.

Mascot
Mammoth Mountain has a popular mascot named "Woolly" who can be found skiing around the mountain, taking pictures with guests, and leading events like a Saturday parade for children. He also appears in promotional videos. Many guests consider it lucky when they have a Woolly sighting. According to Powder Magazine, Woolly is the 8th-best mascot (but they would have rated Woolly higher if Woolly didn't also snowboard).

Despite the mascot name "Woolly", woolly mammoths never existed in the region.

References

External links

 Mammoth Mountain Ski Area web site
 Mammoth Snowman Snow Report web site
 Sierra Survey: User's guide to Mammoth and Southern Sierra Nevada
 The Westin Monache Resort, Mammoth
 A blog which discusses the route to and from Hole in the Wall

Alterra Mountain Company
Companies based in Mono County, California
Inyo National Forest
Sierra Nevada (United States)
Ski areas and resorts in California
Tourist attractions in Mono County, California